Marich may refer to:

People
 Marietta Marich (1930–2017), American actress and director
 George Marich (born 1992), South African rugby union player
 László Szőgyény-Marich (disambiguation)

Places 
 Marich, Iran, a village in Kerman Province, Iran
 Marich, Kenya, a town in Kenya, north of Nairobi where a cement works is proposed